Lagom (pronounced) is a Swedish word meaning "just the right amount" or "not too much, not too little".

The word can be variously translated as "in moderation", "in balance", "perfect-simple", "just enough", "ideal" and "suitable" (in matter of amounts). Whereas words like sufficient and average suggest some degree of abstinence, scarcity, or failure, lagom carries the connotation of appropriateness, although not necessarily perfection. The archetypical Swedish proverb "Lagom är bäst", literally "The right amount is best", is also translated as "Enough is as good as a feast", or as "There is virtue in moderation".

Etymology 
The origin of the term is an archaic dative plural form of lag ("law"), in this case referring not necessarily to judicial law but common sense law. Literally meaning "according to law", a more close translation would be "according to custom" or "according to common sense". The earliest attestations of the word are from 17th century texts.

A common false etymology claims that it is a contraction of "laget om" ("around the team"); according to this myth, the phrase was used in Viking times to specify how much mead one should drink from the horn as it was passed around in order for everyone to receive a fair share.

Use 
Lagom is most often used as an adverb, as in the sentence "Han är lagom lång" (literally "He is just the right height"). Lagom can also be used as an adjective: "Klänningen var lagom för henne" (literally "The dress was just right for her"), which would be equivalent to "The dress fits her". The adjective form is never inflected.

Cultural significance 
The value of "just enough" can be compared to the idiom "less is more", or contrasted to the value of "more is better". It is viewed favorably as a sustainable alternative to the hoarding extremes of consumerism: "Why do I need more than two? Det är [It is] lagom" It can also be viewed as repressive: "You're not supposed to be too good, or too rich".

In a single word, lagom is said to describe the basis of the Swedish national psyche, one of consensus and equality. "My aunt used to hold out her closed fist and say, "How much can you get in this hand? It's much easier to get something in this [open] hand".

Comparable terms in other languages 

The word "lagom" also exists in Norwegian, in both Bokmål and Nynorsk. The connotations in Norwegian, however, are somewhat different from Swedish. In Norwegian the word has synonyms as "fitting, suitable, comfortable, nice, decent, well built/proportioned". While some synonyms are somewhat similar in meaning (e.g. "suitable" and "reasonable", "fitting" and "in balance"), many present in Swedish do not exist in Norwegian and vice versa. The Norwegian words "passelig" and the more common "passe" are very similar, translating roughly as "fitting, adequate, suitable" in English. "Passe" can be used in every context where the Swedish "lagom" is used, e.g. "passe varm" (right temperature/adequately warm), "passe stor" (right size), etc.

Finnish has the word "Sopivasti", which carries similar connotations of "just right".

The concept of lagom is similar to Russian expression normal'no (нормально, literally normally), which indicates a sufficient and sustainable state, for example of one's livelihood. In Russian, the word is often used as answer to the question "how are you". Comparable terms are found in some south Slavic languages, for example Serbo-Croatian umereno or umjereno.

Ιn ancient Greek, there was the famous phrase of Cleobulus, metron ariston,  meaning "moderation [literally: measure] is best".

In Albanian there is the same use of word "taman". The word "taman" derives from Ottoman Turkish "tamam" meaning "precisely", borrowed from Arabic where it means "complete", "perfect". In Albanian is used pretty much the same as "lagom", as in "a taman amount", "not a taman person" (not a normal person), "taman!" (agreed, OK), etc. This word ("taman") is also used in some Slavic languages (South Slavic) and it almost perfectly translates "lagom" to those languages.

In Thai, the word พอเพียง (phor phiang) portrays similar meaning.

In Indonesia, both Indonesian and Javanese, there is a common word for that, pas, which means right amount (countable measurement), match, enough.

In Swiss German dialects exists, similar to lagom, the  word "gäbig", which in German means something like "comfortable", "suitable", "handy", in the case of objects or in relation to people and conditions "affable", "pleasant", "sympathetic".

See also 
 Festina lente
 Goldilocks principle
 Golden mean (philosophy)
 Hygge
 Social model
 Sweet spot
 Sweden: the Middle Way
 Law of Jante
 The Story of the Three Bears
 Centrism, a political ideology
 Moderation, the process of eliminating or lessening extremes.
 Moderate, a middle position in a left/right political scale
 Mathematical optimization, choosing not too high, not too low values of input parameters in view to maximize or minimize an objective function
 Via media, the philosophy of the 'middle way'
 Wasat (Islamic term)

References

External links 
 The Swedish Academy's dictionary, Svenska Akademiens ordbok.

Swedish words and phrases
Swedish culture